Sergei Viktorovich Bulavin (born 19 January 1973, in Yaroslavl) is a former Russian football player who is known for his performance for FC Neftyanik Yaroslavl and FC Severstal Cherepovets in the Russian Second Division.

Bulavin played in the Russian Premier League with FC Shinnik Yaroslavl.

References

1973 births
Footballers from Yaroslavl
Living people
Russian footballers
FC Shinnik Yaroslavl players
Russian Premier League players
FC Sheksna Cherepovets players
FC Arsenal Tula players

Association football midfielders